St Hildas Church is the parish church of Hartlepool, County Durham, England. It is recorded in the National Heritage List for England as a designated Grade I listed building. The church is located in the older part of Hartlepool commonly referred to as the Headland formerly, West Hartlepool. It is one of the many visible buildings on Hartlepools skyline.

Clifton-Taylor includes it in his list of "best" English parish churches and describes it as "a glory of Early English architecture in its earliest and purest phase" and as an "architectural gem".

The tower contains three bells hung for change ringing, all cast in 1819 by Thomas II Mears, however these are considered 'unringable' as the tower is thought to be too weak to deal with the forces associated with change ringing.

References 

Bibliography

External links
Church website

Hartlepool
Hartlepool
Buildings and structures in Hartlepool